Amblyseius incognitus is a species of mite in the family Phytoseiidae.

References

incognitus
Articles created by Qbugbot
Animals described in 1966